The 1960 United States presidential election in Kentucky took place on November 8, 1960, as part of the 1960 United States presidential election. Kentucky voters chose 10 representatives, or electors, to the Electoral College, who voted for president and vice president.

Kentucky was won by incumbent Vice President Richard Nixon (R–California), running with United States Ambassador to the United Nations Henry Cabot Lodge, Jr., with 53.59 percent of the popular vote, against Senator John F. Kennedy (D–Massachusetts), running with Senator Lyndon B. Johnson, with 46.41 percent of the popular vote. Nixon thus became the first Republican to ever carry the Bluegrass State without winning the presidency, and remained the last until John McCain did so in 2008.

Results

Results by county

References

Kentucky
1960
1960 Kentucky elections